Los Angeles High School of the Arts—LAHSA is on the Robert F. Kennedy Community Schools campus, on Wilshire Boulevard in the Koreatown district of Central Los Angeles, California. The public specialty high school is within the Los Angeles Unified School District (LAUSD)

It was formerly known as the BAPA (Belmont Academy of Performing Arts), small learning community established in 1998 by the LAUSD. As was, LAHSA continues BAPA's mission, preparing its students for enrollment and success in four-year university programs, with an emphasis placed on the performing arts: drama, singing, and dancing.

Students take classes in set design, sound production, and lighting design. They are also experience other aspects of theater production, by writing, casting, and directing their own plays.

See also
Robert F. Kennedy Community Schools
California Institute of the Arts

References

External links

Academics

Stem Program 
 Acting
 Technical Theatre (costume, set design, lighting and sound)
 Computer Science
 Physiology
 AP Biology
 Chemistry
 Environmental Science
 Computer-aided Drafting
 Vectorworks
 Algebra 1
 Algebra 2
 Geometry
 Pre-Calculus
 AP Calculus
 Transitional College Math (Statistics)

Current Administration 
Susan Canjura (principal)

Los Angeles Unified School District schools
Art schools in California
Drama schools in the United States
High schools in Los Angeles
Public high schools in California
Schools of the performing arts in the United States
Koreatown, Los Angeles
Theatre in Los Angeles